The chart below details the issues of Dutch guilder banknotes from 1950 to 2002, as well as the subjects featured. Printed and issued dates are included where the issued dates are in parentheses. If in the same year, only one number is shown. 

The final date for exchange to Euros for each banknote is shown in square brackets/italics. A note showing [N/A] means it is no longer exchangeable for Euros; De Nederlandsche Bank generally exchanges banknotes for 30 years following their withdrawal from circulation.

References

Banknotes of Europe
Economic history of the Netherlands